Karelia (Karelian and , ; , historically  Korjela), the land of the Karelian people, is an area in Northern Europe of historical significance for Russia (including the Soviet era), Finland, and Sweden.  It is currently divided between northwestern Russia (specifically the federal subjects of the Republic of Karelia and Leningrad Oblast) and Finland (the regions of South Karelia, North Karelia, and the eastern portion of modern-day Kymenlaakso).

Use of name

Various subdivisions may be called Karelia. Finnish Karelia was a historical province of Finland, and is now divided between Finland and Russia, often called just Karjala in Finnish.  The eastern part of this chiefly Lutheran area was ceded to Russia after the Winter War of 1939–40.

The Republic of Karelia is a Russian federal subject, including East Karelia with a chiefly Russian Orthodox population.

Within present-day Finland, Karjala refers to the regions of South and North Karelia, although parts of historical Karelia also lie within the region of Kymenlaakso (east of the River Kymi), Northern Savonia (Kaavi, Rautavaara and Säyneinen) and Southern Savonia (Mäntyharju).

Geography

Karelia stretches from the White Sea coast to the Gulf of Finland. It contains the two largest lakes in Europe, Lake Ladoga and Lake Onega. The Karelian Isthmus is located between the Gulf of Finland and Lake Ladoga.

The border between Karelia and Ingria, the land of the closely related Ingrian people, had originally been the Neva River itself but later on it was moved northward into Karelian isthmus to follow the Sestra River, today in the Saint Petersburg metropolitan area, but in 1812–1940 the Russo-Finnish border.

On the other side of Lake Ladoga, the River Svir is usually thought of as the traditional southern border of Karelian territory while Lake Onega and the White Sea mark the Eastern border. The River Kymi marks the historic western border of Karelian territory as it served as the boundary between the Häme Finns and the Karelians during the Middle Ages. The River Kymi is also said to have formed a boundary between the eastern and western cultural spheres by the beginning of the Bronze Age at the latest. In the North lived the nomadic Samis, but there were no natural borders except for large wooded areas (taiga) and the tundra.

In historical texts Karelia is sometimes divided into East Karelia and West Karelia, which are also called Russian Karelia and Finnish Karelia respectively.  The area to the north of Lake Ladoga which belonged to Finland before World War II is called Ladoga Karelia, and the parishes on the old pre-war border are sometimes called Border Karelia. White Sea Karelia (sometimes the Finnish or Karelian term "Viena Karelia", or in some English-language sources, "White Karelia", is used) is the northern part of East Karelia and Olonets Karelia is the southern part.

Tver Karelia denotes the villages in the Tver Oblast that are inhabited by Tver Karelians.

Inhabited localities
Republic of Karelia
Petrozavodsk (Petroskoi, from late 1941 to 1944 known as Äänislinna/Onegaborg to Finns)
Belomorsk (Sorokka)
Medvežyegorsk (Karhumäki)
Kalevala (Uhtua)
Kem (Vienan Kemi, compare with Kemi)
Kostomukša (Kostamus)
Kondopoga  (Kontupohja)
Sortavala (Sortavala, Sordavala)
Suojarvi  (Suojärvi)
Segeža  (Sekehe)
Pitkjaranta (Pitkäranta)
Olonec (Aunus)
Karelian Isthmus
Vyborg (Viipuri, Viborg)
Priozersk (Käkisalmi/Kexholm)
Svetogorsk (Enso)
South Karelia
Imatra
Joutseno
Lappeenranta (Villmanstrand)
North Karelia
Joensuu
Ilomantsi (Ilomants)
Kitee
Kesälahti
Kontiolahti
Lieksa
Liperi
Nurmes
Outokumpu

History

Karelia was bitterly fought over by Sweden and the Novgorod Republic for a period starting in the 13th-century Swedish-Novgorodian Wars. The Treaty of Nöteborg (Finnish: Pähkinäsaaren rauha) in 1323 divided Karelia between the two. Viborg (Finnish: Viipuri) became the capital of the new Swedish province. In the Treaty of Stolbovo in 1617 large parts of Russian Karelia were ceded to Sweden. Conflicts between the new Swedish rulers and the indigenous population of these areas led to an exodus: thousands of Karelians, including the ancestors of the Tver Karelians, emigrated to Russia.

The Treaty of Nystad (Finnish: Uudenkaupungin rauha) in 1721 between Imperial Russia and Sweden ceded a portion of Karelia to Russia. The Treaty of Åbo in 1743 between Sweden and Russia then ceded South Karelia to Russia. After Finland had been occupied by Russia in the Finnish War, parts of the ceded provinces (Old Finland) were incorporated into the Grand Duchy of Finland. In 1917, Finland became independent and the border was confirmed by the Treaty of Tartu in 1920.

Finnish partisans were involved in attempts to overthrow the Bolsheviks in Russian Karelia (East Karelia) in 1918–21, as in the failed Aunus expedition. They also wanted to incorporate the rest of Karelia into Finland and cooperated with the short-lived Republic of Uhtua. These mainly private expeditions ended after the signing of the Treaty of Tartu. After the end of the Russian Civil War and the establishment of the Soviet Union in 1922, the Russian part of Karelia became the Karelian Autonomous republic of the Soviet Union (ASSR) in 1923.

At the beginning of the Second World War in 1939, the Soviet Union attacked Finland, thus starting the Winter War. The Treaty of Moscow, signed in 1940, handed a large portion of Finnish Karelia to the Soviet Union, and over 400,000 people had to be relocated within Finland. During the Continuation War, between 1941 and 1944, the Finns invaded and occupied much of East Karelia for three years. After the war, Soviet expansion caused considerable bitterness in Finland, which lost its fourth biggest city, Viipuri, its industrial heartland along the river Vuoksi, the Saimaa canal that connected central Finland to the Gulf of Finland, and access to the fishing waters of Lake Ladoga (Finnish: Laatokka). One eighth of its citizens became refugees with no chance of return. The whole population from the areas ceded to the Soviet Union was evacuated and resettled in other parts of Finland. The present inhabitants of the former Finnish parts of Russia, including the city of Vyborg/Viipuri and the Karelian Isthmus – are post-war immigrants or their descendants.

The former Karelian ASSR was incorporated into a new Karelo-Finnish SSR from 1941 to 1956, but then it became an ASSR again. Karelia was the only Soviet republic that was "demoted" from an SSR to an ASSR within the Russian SFSR. Unlike administrative republics, Soviet republics (in theory) had the constitutional right to secede. Fear of secession, as well as the Russian ethnic minority in Karelia, may have resulted in its "demotion". 

In 1991, with the collapse of the Soviet Union, the ASSR became the Republic of Karelia. The political collapse brought about an economic collapse and the Republic has experienced massive urban decay. The buildings hastily and poorly constructed during the Soviet era, as well as older houses remaining from the Finnish era, are being abandoned.

Politics

Karelia is politically divided between Finland and Russia. The Republic of Karelia is a federal subject of Russia formed in 1991 from the Karelian ASSR. The Karelian Isthmus belongs to the Leningrad Oblast. The Finnish side consists of parts of the regions (maakunta) of South Karelia, North Karelia and Kymenlaakso.

There are some small but enthusiastic groups of Finns campaigning for closer ties between Finland and Karelia. The political expression of their irredentist hopes is called the Karelian question and concerns Finland's re-acquisition of the ceded Finnish Karelia. These hopes live on, for instance, in the Karjalan Liitto (Karelian League) and ProKarelia. However, ambitions for closer ties with East Karelia no longer include territorial demands.

Demographics
The Russian side is mostly Russian-speaking. However, there are minorities speaking either Finnish or the Karelian language especially in the Republic of Karelia and in the Karelian villages of the Tver Region of Northwest Russia. The more distantly related Veps language is spoken on both sides of the River Svir. Finnish and Karelian have had varying levels of recognition in Russian Karelia throughout history.
On the Finnish side, the area is Finnish-speaking. The Karelian dialects of the Finnish language (which are different from the Karelian language) are spoken mainly in Finnish South Karelia and form the southeastern dialect group of Finnish. The dialects in Finnish North Karelia belong to the large group of Savonian dialects in Eastern and Central Finland.

Ingrian Finnish dialects are spoken in Ingria, which is an area around St. Petersburg, between the Estonian border and Lake Ladoga. Ingrian Finns settled in the region in the 17th century after the Swedish conquest of the area. The settlers spoke Karelian and Savonian dialects of Finnish. The older inhabitants of the Ingria, the Ingrians, have their own language which is related to the Karelian language and the south-eastern dialects of Finnish.

Karelians evacuated from the part of Finnish Karelia ceded to Russia were resettled all over Finland. Today about one million people in Finland can trace their roots in the area ceded to the Soviet Union after World War II. In Finland, about 5,000 people speak the Karelian language.

Culture

Kalevala
Karelian Bear Dog
Karelian hot pot
Karelian language
Karelian pasties
Karelo-Finnish Laika
Music of Karelia

Tourism 

Russian Karelia is a regular destination for international tourism due to its unique architectural, cultural and historical sites such as Kizhi and Valaam. The region is visited by tourists in both summer and winter when possible activities include riding in a sled behind a dog team and running from the banya to an ice hole and back. Summer hikers can visit the Kivach waterfall or the Demon's Chair plateau.

In South Karelia, Lappeenranta is a popular destination for Russian tourists, with 1.5 million visiting annually. Imatrankoski in Imatra has been a tourist attraction since the late 18th century, when the Empress of Russia Catherine the Great visited the site in 1772.

Koli National Park in North Karelia began receiving tourists when Karelianism became a major trend. Koli was a source of inspiration for numerous painters and composers such as Jean Sibelius, Juhani Aho and Eero Järnefelt, who in turn contributed to Karelianism through their work. Koli gained national park status in 1991.

See also
Asbestos-ceramic, a type of pottery made in Karelia and the vicinity.
History of Finland
Karelianism, a cultural movement in the Grand Duchy of Finland.
Karelia Suite, a collection of pieces by the composer Jean Sibelius.
Lauri Törni, born in Viipuri, a soldier and recipient of the Mannerheim Cross during the Continuation War, who later served with the German and American armies.

References

Sources
"They Took My Father," by Mayme Sevander and Laurie Hertzel, a history of Finnish Americans who emigrated to Soviet Karelia during the Great Depression.

Further reading

External links

 Karelians (The Peoples of the Red Book)
 Tracing Finland's eastern border – ThisisFINLAND
Saimaa Canal links two Karelia – ThisisFINLAND
 Regional flag
 Visitkarelia.fi – Information about travel, tourism and other fields in North Karelia
 Information about Southern Karelia travel
 Pielis.ru –  travel information about North Karelia region and City of Joensuu
 Karelia will return in your dreams Article about Karelia with photos and useful tourist information.
 Genocide in Soviet Karelia: Stalin's Terror and the Finns of Soviet Karelia 
 Their Ideals Were Crushed. A Daughter's Story of the Säde Commune in Soviet Karelia.

 
Barents Sea
White Sea
Geography of Finland
Divided regions
Historical regions
Fennoscandia